Cherlenivka is a commune in Chernivtsi Raion, Chernivtsi Oblast, Ukraine. It belongs to Vanchykivtsi rural hromada, one of the hromadas of Ukraine. 

Until 18 July 2020, Cherlenivka belonged to Novoselytsia Raion. The raion was abolished in July 2020 as part of the administrative reform of Ukraine, which reduced the number of raions of Chernivtsi Oblast to three. The area of Novoselytsia Raion was split between Chernivtsi and Dnistrovskyi Raions, with Cherlenivka being transferred to Chernivtsi Raion.

Notable people
 Anatolie Moraru

External links 
 Datele generale ale recensământului din 2001
 Date detaliate privitoare la numărul românilor
 Românii din Cernăuți

Notes

Villages in Chernivtsi Raion
Khotinsky Uyezd